Halvosso is a hamlet in the civil parish of Mabe in west Cornwall, England, UK. It is in the civil parish of Constantine.

References

Hamlets in Cornwall